This is a list of musicians and groups who compose and play free music, or free improvisation. In alphabetical order:

Musicians 
 Susan Alcorn – pedal steel guitar
 Jason Alder – clarinet, bass clarinet, contrabass clarinet
 Thomas Ankersmit – saxophone, synthesizer
 Anders Astrand - percussion
 Albert Ayler – saxophone
 Richard Barrett – electronics, sampler
 Derek Bailey – guitar
 Conny Bauer – trombone
 Burkhard Beins – percussion
 Samm Bennett – percussion, electronics
 Han Bennink – percussion
 Steve Beresford – piano
 Jean-Jacques Birge – synthesizer
 Jeb Bishop – trombone
 Anthony Braxton – saxophones
 John Wolf Brennan – piano, prepared piano, melodica, pipe organ
 Peter Brötzmann – saxophone, taragato
 Tony Buck – percussion
 John Butcher – saxophone
 Captain Beefheart – saxophone, clarinet, voice
 Kent Carter – double bass
 Graham Clark – violin
 Ornette Coleman – saxophone
 Tom Cora – cello, bass guitar, drums
 Lol Coxhill – saxophone
 Marilyn Crispell – piano
 Stephen Crowe – guitar, electric guitar
 Alvin Curran - electronics
 Chris Cutler – percussion
 Tobias Delius – saxophone
 Poulomi Desai - modified sitars and electronics
 Christy Doran – guitar
 Mark Dresser – double bass
 Kevin Drumm – guitar, synthesizer
 Paul Dunmall – saxophone
 Ellery Eskelin – tenor saxophone
 Karlheinz Essl – electronics
 Julia Feldman – voice
 Simon H. Fell – double bass
 Robert Fripp - guitar, mellotron
 Fred Frith – guitar, violin
 Cor Fuhler – piano, keyolin, synthesizer
 Bernhard Gal – electronics
 Joel Garten – piano
 Charles Gayle – saxophone, piano, bass clarinet
 Richard Grayson – piano
 Mats Gustafsson – saxophone, fluteophone
 Barry Guy – double bass
 Keiji Haino – guitar, voice
 Hans Hassler - accordion
 Gerry Hemingway – drums
 Zach Hill – drums
 Killick Erik Hinds – h'arpeggione
 Tim Hodgkinson – saxophone
 Theo Joergensmann – basset clarinet
 Ryan Jones – electric bass
 Henry Kaiser – guitar
 Leonel Kaplan – trumpet
 Basil Kirchin – drums
 Peter Kowald – double bass
 Savina Yannatou – voice
 Caroline Kraabel – saxophone
 Steve Lacy – saxophone
 Kathryn Ladano – bass clarinet
 Yuri Landman – string instruments
 Jeanne Lee – voice
 Thomas Lehn – synthesizer
 George E. Lewis – trombone, electronics
 Joelle Leandre – double bass, vocals
 Fred Lonberg-Holm – cello
 Paul Lovens – drums
 Paul Lytton – drums
 Frederik Magle – organ
 Radu Malfatti – trombone
 Joe Maneri – saxophone, clarinet
 Mario Mariani – piano, objects
 Elio Martusciello – computer, guitar
 Mattin
 Guerino Mazzola – piano
 Misha Mengelberg – piano, toys
 Hugh Metcalfe – violin, guitar, drums
 Phil Minton – voice
 Louis Moholo – drums
 Gabriela Montero – piano
 Michael Moore – saxophone, clarinet, bass clarinet
 Thurston Moore – guitar
 Butch Morris – cornet, conductor
 Jamie Muir – percussion
 Stephen Nachmanovitch – violin, electric violin, viola
 Lauren Newton - voice
 Maggie Nicols – voice
 Mary Oliver – violin, viola
 Tony Oxley – percussion
 Sonia Paço-Rocchia –  bassoon, found and invented instruments, live electronics
 Evan Parker – saxophones
 William Parker – double bass
 Mike Patton – voice, piano, synthesizer
 Barre Phillips – double bass
 Andreas Paolo Perger – guitar
 Pierre Pincemaille – organ
 Eddie Prevost – percussion, drums
 Sun Ra — Keyboards, piano, minimoog
 Randy Raine-Reusch – zheng, khaen, sho, kayageum, ichigenkin
 Lee Ranaldo – guitar
 Marc Rebillet — electronics, keyboards, voice
 Hans Reichel – guitar, daxophone
 Ernst Reijseger – cello
 Omar Rodriguez-Lopez – guitar
 Keith Rowe – guitar
 John Russell – guitar
 Paul Rutherford – trombone
 Frederic Rzewski
 Carlos Sandoval – gloves with sensors
 Giancarlo Schiaffini – trombone
 Alexander von Schlippenbach – piano
 Steven Schoenberg – piano
 Irene Schweizer – piano
 Matthew Shipp – piano
 Gary Smith – guitar
 John Stevens – percussion, trumpet
 György Szabados – piano
 Cecil Taylor – piano
 Benedict Taylor – viola
 Pat Thomas – piano, keyboards
 John Tilbury – piano
 Keith Tippett – piano
 Julie Tippetts – voice
 Tommy Vig – vibraphone, drums
 Bernard Vitet – trumpet
 Voice Crack – electronics
 Philipp Wachsmann – violin
 John Bruce Wallace – electric guitar
 Jane Wang (composer and musician) – double bass
 Trevor Watts – saxophone
 Kenny Wheeler – trumpet
 Wolter Wierbos – trombone
 Wu Fei - guzheng
 Otomo Yoshihide – guitar, turntable
 Reynaldo Young – guitar, electronics
 Carlos Zingaro – violin, electronics
 John Zorn – saxophone
 Frank Zappa – Guitar
 Jerry Garcia – Guitar,Face Stealer
 Bob Weir – Guitar
 Phil Lesh – Bass Guitar
 Bill Kreutzmann – Drums
 Mickey Hart – Drums,Percussion
 Ron "Pigpen" McKernan – Hammond organ,Harmonica
 Keith Godchaux – Piano
 Trey Anastasio – Guitar,Face Melter
 Mike Gordon – Bass Guitar
 Page McConnell – Piano,Keyboards
 Jon Fishman – Drums

Groups 
 A Band
 AMM
 Borbetomagus
 Brotherhood of Breath
 Conspirators of Pleasure
 EOTO
 Feminist Improvising Group
 Fred Frith Trio
 Goose
 Grateful Dead
 Gruppo di Improvvisazione Nuova Consonanza
 Henry Cow
 Islak Köpek
 King Crimson
 Last Exit
 M.I.M.E.O.
 Massacre
 MATH
 Maybe Monday
 Mujician
 Musica Elettronica Viva
 nmperign
 Phish
 poire z
 Red Square
 San Agustin
 Scatter
 Shaking Ray Levis
 Skeleton Crew
 Spontaneous Music Ensemble
 Storm & Stress
 Supersilent
 Triangulation 
 Un Drame Musical Instantane
 Wolf Eyes
 Zoochosis
 Zoviet France

References

 
 
Free improvisation